Thomas Spurway (1481/83-1548), of Exeter, Devon, was an English Member of Parliament.

He was a Member (MP) of the Parliament of England for Exeter in 1542. He was born in Tiverton, Devon. He was described by his contemporary, John Hooker as: ‘a reasonably tall man of stature, well compact of body, wise [of] nature and discreet, willing to please and loath to offend any man’.

References

1480s births
1548 deaths
English MPs 1542–1544
Politicians from Tiverton, Devon
Members of the Parliament of England (pre-1707) for Exeter